Clifton is an unincorporated locale in Hood River County, Oregon, United States. It is located about 3 miles west of the city of Hood River. The name originates from the drop in elevation Interstate 84 takes from the cliffs there, which are 250 feet above the Columbia River.

References

External links
1931 map showing Clifton

Unincorporated communities in Hood River County, Oregon
Unincorporated communities in Oregon